Hasan Celal Güzel (1945 – 19 March 2018) was a Turkish journalist and politician. He was Minister of Education, Youth and Sport (1987–1989). He was leader of the Rebirth Party in the 1990s, a party he co-founded in 1992. He was a columnist for Radikal and Vatan.

Career
After graduating from Ankara University with a degree in economics Güzel worked in the State Planning Organization, and then in various administrative roles in the government including in the Prime Minister's office.

In a 1986 election he was elected to the Grand National Assembly of Turkey for the Motherland Party (Turkish: Anavatan Partisi), serving as a minister of state. He was re-elected in the 1987 elections and was appointed minister of education, youth and sport (1987–1989).

On 23 November 1992, Güzel co-founded the Rebirth Party (YDP) and was elected its vice-chair. He was the leader of the party during the 1994 Turkish local elections and 1999.

In 2012 Güzel said that General Teoman Koman had approached him in September 1996 with a view to installing him or Mesut Yılmaz as prime minister after a planned coup. Güzel declined to get involved. In the event, Yılmaz was appointed Prime Minister after the 28 February 1997 "post-modern coup".

References

1945 births
2018 deaths
People from Gaziantep
Ankara University Faculty of Political Sciences alumni
Deputies of Gaziantep
Ministers of National Education of Turkey
Leaders of political parties in Turkey
Motherland Party (Turkey) politicians
Turkish columnists
Radikal (newspaper) people
Ministers of Youth and Sports of Turkey
Members of the 45th government of Turkey
Ministers of State of Turkey